Eucereon punctata is a moth of the subfamily Arctiinae. It was described by Félix Édouard Guérin-Méneville in 1844. It is found in Guatemala, Suriname and the Amazon region.

References

 

punctata
Moths described in 1844